Cheiloneurus is a parasitic wasp genus in the family Encyrtidae.

Species 
 Cheiloneurus afer
 Cheiloneurus alaskae
 Cheiloneurus albicornis
 Cheiloneurus albinotatus
 Cheiloneurus angulatus
 Cheiloneurus angustifrons
 Cheiloneurus annulicornis
 Cheiloneurus antipodis
 Cheiloneurus apeniculus
 Cheiloneurus argentifer
 Cheiloneurus assamensis
 Cheiloneurus axillaris
 Cheiloneurus bangalorensis
 Cheiloneurus banksi
 Cheiloneurus basiri
 Cheiloneurus beerwahi
 Cheiloneurus bifasciatus
 Cheiloneurus bimaculatus
 Cheiloneurus boldyrevi
 Cheiloneurus bonariensis
 Cheiloneurus bouceki
 Cheiloneurus brunneipes
 Cheiloneurus burnsi
 Cheiloneurus caesar
 Cheiloneurus callidus
 Cheiloneurus carinatus
 Cheiloneurus ceroplastis
 Cheiloneurus cheles
 Cheiloneurus chiaromontei
 Cheiloneurus chinensis
 Cheiloneurus chlorodryini
 Cheiloneurus chrysopae
 Cheiloneurus cinctiventris
 Cheiloneurus claviger
 Cheiloneurus coimbatorensis
 Cheiloneurus compressicornis
 Cheiloneurus cristatus
 Cheiloneurus cushmani
 Cheiloneurus cyanonotus
 Cheiloneurus daghestanicus
 Cheiloneurus diversicolor
 Cheiloneurus divinus
 Cheiloneurus dubius
 Cheiloneurus dumasi
 Cheiloneurus elcielo
 Cheiloneurus elegans
 Cheiloneurus exitiosus
 Cheiloneurus flaccus
 Cheiloneurus flavipes
 Cheiloneurus flaviscutellum
 Cheiloneurus flavoscutatus
 Cheiloneurus fulvescens
 Cheiloneurus gahani
 Cheiloneurus giraulti
 Cheiloneurus glaphyra
 Cheiloneurus gonatopodis
 Cheiloneurus hadrodorys
 Cheiloneurus hawaiicus
 Cheiloneurus hawaiiensis
 Cheiloneurus hemipterus
 Cheiloneurus hugoi
 Cheiloneurus inimicus
 Cheiloneurus izhevskyi
 Cheiloneurus japonicus
 Cheiloneurus javanus
 Cheiloneurus javensis
 Cheiloneurus kanagawaensis
 Cheiloneurus kansensis
 Cheiloneurus kerrichi
 Cheiloneurus kollari
 Cheiloneurus kuisebi
 Cheiloneurus lakhimpurensis
 Cheiloneurus lateocaudatus
 Cheiloneurus latifrons
 Cheiloneurus latiscapus
 Cheiloneurus leptulus
 Cheiloneurus lineascapus
 Cheiloneurus liorhipnusi
 Cheiloneurus longicornis
 Cheiloneurus longipennis
 Cheiloneurus longiventris
 Cheiloneurus loretanus
 Cheiloneurus malayensis
 Cheiloneurus manipurensis
 Cheiloneurus margiscutellum
 Cheiloneurus marilandia (Girault, 1917) 
 Cheiloneurus matsuyamensis
 Cheiloneurus mazzinini
 Cheiloneurus metallicus
 Cheiloneurus molokaiensis
 Cheiloneurus morozkoi
 Cheiloneurus neparvus
 Cheiloneurus nigrescens
 Cheiloneurus nigricornis
 Cheiloneurus nitidulus
 Cheiloneurus novimandibularis
 Cheiloneurus noxius
 Cheiloneurus noyesi
 Cheiloneurus oahuensis
 Cheiloneurus obscurus
 Cheiloneurus olmii
 Cheiloneurus orbitalis
 Cheiloneurus pachycephalus
 Cheiloneurus paralia
 Cheiloneurus parvus
 Cheiloneurus pasteuri
 Cheiloneurus peniculoartus
 Cheiloneurus perbellus
 Cheiloneurus perpulcher
 Cheiloneurus phenacocci
 Cheiloneurus pistaciae
 Cheiloneurus praenitens
 Cheiloneurus pulcher
 Cheiloneurus pulvinariae
 Cheiloneurus purpureicinctus
 Cheiloneurus purpureiventris
 Cheiloneurus pyrillae
 Cheiloneurus quadricolor
 Cheiloneurus quercus
 Cheiloneurus rarus
 Cheiloneurus reate
 Cheiloneurus rediculus
 Cheiloneurus regis
 Cheiloneurus saissetiae
 Cheiloneurus seminigriclavus
 Cheiloneurus sinensis
 Cheiloneurus submuticus
 Cheiloneurus swezeyi
 Cheiloneurus tainus
 Cheiloneurus tenuicornis
 Cheiloneurus tenuistigma
 Cheiloneurus triguttatipennis
 Cheiloneurus udaghamundus
 Cheiloneurus unicolor
 Cheiloneurus vanpoetereni
 Cheiloneurus victor
 Cheiloneurus viridiscutum
 Cheiloneurus vulcanus
 Cheiloneurus westwoodi
 Cheiloneurus zeyai

See also 
 List of encyrtid genera

References

External links 

Encyrtinae
Hymenoptera genera